Un día (Spanish for "One day") is the fifth studio album of Argentine singer-songwriter Juana Molina. It was first released on October 6, 2008 by Domino Records. Sonically, the album is an abstract and consists of layered loops. It received generally positive reviews from music critics.

Track listing 
"Un día" (One day)  5:35
"Vive solo" (He Lives alone) – 5:58
"Lo dejamos" (We leave it) – 7:31
"Los hongos de Marosa" (The Mushrooms of Marosa) – 7:27
"¿Quién? (Suite)" (Who? (Suite)) – 7:22
"El vestido" (The dress) – 4:31
"No llama" (He doesn't call) – 5:20
"Dar (qué difícil)" (To Give (How Hard)) – 6:41

References

2008 albums
Domino Recording Company albums
Juana Molina albums